Al-Za'ala is a sub-district located in al-Saddah District, Ibb Governorate, Yemen. Al-Za'ala had a population of 5727 according to the 2004 census.

References 

Sub-districts in As Saddah District